The GeForce 8 series is the eighth generation of Nvidia's GeForce line of graphics processing units. The third major GPU architecture developed by Nvidia, Tesla represents the company's first unified shader architecture.

Overview
All GeForce 8 Series products are based on Tesla. As with many GPUs, the larger numbers these cards carry does not guarantee superior performance over previous generation cards with a lower number. For example, the GeForce 8300 and 8400 entry-level cards cannot be compared to the previous GeForce 7200 and 7300 cards due to their inferior performance. The same goes for the high-end GeForce 8800 GTX card, which cannot be compared to the previous GeForce 7800 GTX card due to differences in performance.

Max resolution
Dual Dual-link DVI Support:
Able to drive two flat-panel displays up to 2560×1600 resolution. Available on select GeForce 8800 and 8600 GPUs.

One Dual-link DVI Support:
Able to drive one flat-panel display up to 2560×1600 resolution. Available on select GeForce 8500 GPUs and GeForce 8400 GS cards based on the G98.

One Single-link DVI Support:
Able to drive one flat-panel display up to 1920×1200 resolution. Available on select GeForce 8400 GPUs. GeForce 8400 GS cards based on the G86 only support single-link DVI.

Display capabilities
The GeForce 8 series supports 10-bit per channel display output, up from 8-bit on previous Nvidia cards. This potentially allows higher fidelity color representation and separation on capable displays. The GeForce 8 series, like its recent predecessors, also supports Scalable Link Interface (SLI) for multiple installed cards to act as one via an SLI Bridge, so long as they are of similar architecture.

NVIDIA's PureVideo HD video rendering technology is an improved version of the original PureVideo introduced with GeForce 6. It now includes GPU-based hardware acceleration for decoding HD movie formats, post-processing of HD video for enhanced images, and optional High-bandwidth Digital Content Protection (HDCP) support at the card level.

GeForce 8300 and 8400 series

In the summer of 2007 Nvidia released the entry-level GeForce 8300 GS and 8400 GS graphics cards, based on the G86 core. The GeForce 8300 was only available in the OEM market, and was also available in integrated motherboard GPU form as the GeForce 8300 mGPU. As with many entry-level graphics cards, these cards are often less powerful than mid-range and high-end cards. Because of the reduced performance of these cards, they are not intended to be used for intense 3D applications such as fast, high-resolution video games. However, they could still play most games in their lower settings and resolutions, making these cards popular among casual gamers and HTPC (Media Center) builders without a PCI Express or AGP slot on the motherboard. They were originally designed to replace the low-cost GeForce 7200 series and entry-level GeForce 7300 series, but could not do so due to their inferior gaming performance.

At the end of 2007 NVIDIA released a new GeForce 8400 GS based on the G98 (D8M) chip. It is quite different from the G86 used for the "first" 8400 GS, as the G98 features VC-1 and MPEG2 video decoding completely in hardware, lower power consumption, lowered 3D-performance and a smaller fabrication process. The G98 also features dual-link DVI support and PCI Express 2.0. G86 and G98 cards were both sold as "8400 GS", the difference showing only in the technical specifications. Sometimes this card is called "GeForce 8400 GS Rev. 2".

During mid-2010 Nvidia released another revision of the GeForce 8400 GS based on the GT218 chip. It has a larger amount of RAM, and is capable of DirectX 10.1, OpenGL 3.3 and Shader 4.1. This card is also known as "GeForce 8400 GS Rev. 3".

GeForce 8500 and 8600 series
On April 17, 2007, Nvidia released the GeForce 8500 GT for the entry-level market, and the GeForce 8600 GT and 8600 GTS for the mid-range market.

Nvidia introduced 2nd-generation PureVideo with this series. As the first major update to PureVideo since the GeForce 6's launch, 2nd-gen PureVideo offered much improved hardware-decoding for H.264.

GeForce 8800 series

The 8800 series, codenamed G80, was launched on November 8, 2006, with the release of the GeForce 8800 GTX and GTS for the high-end market. A 320 MB GTS was released on February 12 and the Ultra was released on May 2, 2007. The cards are larger than their predecessors, with the 8800 GTX measuring 10.6 in (~26.9 cm) in length and the 8800 GTS measuring 9 in (~23 cm). Both cards have two dual-link DVI connectors and an HDTV/S-Video out connector. The 8800 GTX requires 2 PCIe power inputs to keep within the PCIe standard, while the GTS requires just one.

8800 GS
The 8800 GS is a trimmed-down 8800 GT with 96 stream processors and either 384 or 768 MB of RAM on a 192-bit bus. In May 2008, it was rebranded as the 9600 GSO in an attempt to spur sales.

On April 28, 2008, Apple announced an updated iMac line featuring an 8800 GS. However, the GPU is actually a rebranded Nvidia GeForce 8800M GTS. It features up to 512 MB of 800 MHz GDDR3 video memory, 64 unified stream processors, a 500 MHz core speed, a 256-bit memory bus width, and a 1250 MHz shader clock.

8800 GTX / 8800 Ultra

The 8800 GTX is equipped with 768 MB GDDR3 RAM. The 8800 series replaced the GeForce 7950 Series as Nvidia's top-performing consumer GPU. GeForce 8800 GTX and GTS use identical GPU cores, but the GTS model disables parts of the GPU and reduces RAM size and bus width to lower production cost.

At the time, the G80 was the largest commercial GPU ever constructed. It consists of 681 million transistors covering a 480 mm² die surface area built on a 90 nm process. (In fact the G80's total transistor count is ~686 million, but since the chip was made on a 90 nm process and due to process limitations and yield feasibility, Nvidia had to break the main design into two chips: Main shader core at 681 million transistors and NV I/O core of about ~5 million transistors making the entire G80 design standing at ~686 million transistors).

A minor manufacturing defect related to a resistor of improper value caused a recall of the 8800 GTX models just two days before the product launch, though the launch itself was unaffected.

The GeForce 8800 GTX was by far the fastest GPU when first released, and 13 months after its initial debut it still remained one of the fastest. The GTX has 128 stream processors clocked at 1.35 GHz, a core clock of 575 MHz, and 768 MB of 384-bit GDDR3 memory at 1.8 GHz, giving it a memory bandwidth of 86.4 GB/s. The card performs faster than a single Radeon HD 2900 XT, and faster than 2 Radeon X1950 XTXs in Crossfire or 2 GeForce 7900 GTXs in SLI. The 8800 GTX also supports HDCP, but one major flaw is its older NVIDIA PureVideo processor that uses more CPU resources. Originally retailing for around US$600, prices came down to under US$400 before it was discontinued. The 8800 GTX was also very power hungry for its time, demanding up to 185 watts of power and requiring two 6-pin PCI-E power connectors to operate. The 8800 GTX also has 2 SLI connector ports, allowing it to support NVIDIA 3-way SLI for users who run demanding games at extreme resolutions such as 2560x1600.

The 8800 Ultra, retailing at a higher price, is identical to the GTX architecturally, but features higher clocked shaders, core and memory. Nvidia later told the media the 8800 Ultra was a new stepping, creating less heat therefore clocking higher. Originally retailing from $800 to $1000, most users thought the card to be a poor value, offering only 10% more performance than the GTX but costing hundreds of dollars more. Prices dropped to as low as $200 before being discontinued on January 23, 2008. The core clock of the Ultra runs at 612 MHz, the shaders at 1.5 GHz, and finally the memory at 2.16 GHz, giving the Ultra a theoretical memory bandwidth of 103.7 GB/s. It has 2 SLI connector ports, allowing it to support Nvidia 3-way SLI. An updated dual slot cooler was also implemented, allowing for quieter and cooler operation at higher clock speeds.

8800 GT

The 8800 GT, codenamed G92, was released on October 29, 2007. The card is the first to transition to 65 nm process, and supports PCI-Express 2.0. It has a single-slot cooler as opposed to the double slot cooler on the 8800 GTS and GTX, and uses less power than GTS and GTX due to its 65 nm process. While its core processing power is comparable to that of the GTX, the 256-bit memory interface and the 512 MB of GDDR3 memory often hinders its performance at very high resolutions and graphics settings. The 8800 GT, unlike other 8800 cards, is equipped with the PureVideo HD VP2 engine for GPU assisted decoding of the H.264 and VC-1 codecs. Performance benchmarks at stock speeds place it above the 8800 GTS (640 MB and 320 MB versions) and slightly below the 8800 GTX. A 256 MB version of the 8800 GT with lower stock memory speeds (1.4 GHz as opposed to 1.8 GHz) but the same core is also available. Performance benchmarks have shown that the 256 MB version of the 8800 GT has a considerable performance disadvantage when compared to its 512 MB counterpart, especially in newer games such as Crysis. Some manufacturers also make models with 1 GB of memory; and with large resolutions and big textures one can perceive a performance difference in the benchmarks. These models are more likely to take up to 2 slots of the computer.

The release of this card presents an odd dynamic to the graphics processing industry. At an NVIDIA projected initial street price of around $300, this card outperforms the ATI flagship HD2900XT in most situations, and even NVIDIA's own 8800 GTS 640 MB (previously priced at an MSRP of $400). The card, only marginally slower in synthetic and gaming benchmarks than the 8800 GTX, also takes much of the value away from Nvidia's own high-end card.

Compatibility issue with PCI-E 1.0a
Shortly after the release, an incompatibility issue with older PCI Express 1.0a motherboards was unmasked. When using the PCI Express 2.0 compliant 8800 GT or 8800 GTS 512 in some motherboards with PCI Express 1.0a slots, the card would not produce any display image, but the computer would often boot (with the fan on the video card spinning at a constant 100%). The incompatibility has been confirmed on motherboards with VIA PT880Pro/Ultra, Intel 925 and Intel 5000P PCI-E 1.0a chipsets.

Some graphics cards had a workaround, which was to re-flash the graphics card's BIOS with an older GEN1 BIOS. However this effectively made it into a PCI Express 1.0 card, not being able to utilize the PCIE 2.0 functions. This could be considered a non-issue however since the card itself could not even utilize the full capacity of the regular PCIE 1.0 slots, there was no noticeable performance reduction. Also flashing of the video card BIOS voided the warranties of most video card manufacturers (if not all) thus making it a less-than-optimum way of getting the card to work properly. A workaround to this is to flash the BIOS of the motherboard to the latest version, which depending on the manufacturer of the motherboard, may contain a fix. In relation to this compatibility issue, the high numbers of cards reported as DOA (as much as 13–15%) were believed to be inaccurate. When it was revealed that the G92 8800 GT and 8800 GTS 512 MB were going to be designed with PCI Express 2.0 connections, NVIDIA claimed that all cards would have full backwards-compatibility, but failed to mention that this was only true for PCI Express 1.1 motherboards. The source for the BIOS-flash did not come from NVIDIA or any of their partners, but rather ASRock, a mainboard producer, who mentioned the fix in one of their motherboard FAQs. ASUSTek, sells the 8800 GT with their sticker, posted a newer version of their 8800 GT BIOS on their website, but did not mention that it fixed this issue. EVGA also posted a new bios to fix this issue.

The performance (at the time) and popularity of this card is demonstrated by the fact that even as late as 2014, the 8800 GT was often listed as the minimum requirement for modern games developed for much more powerful hardware.

8800 GTS
The first releases of the 8800 GTS line, in November 2006, came in 640 MB and 320 MB configurations of GDDR3 RAM and utilized Nvidia's G80 GPU. While the 8800 GTX has 128 stream processors and a 384-bit memory bus, these versions of 8800 GTS feature 96 stream processors and a 320-bit bus. With respect to features, however, they are identical because they use the same GPU.

Around the same release date as the 8800 GT, Nvidia released a new 640 MB version of the 8800 GTS. While still based on the 90 nm G80 core, this version has 7 out of the 8 clusters of 16 stream processors enabled (as opposed to 6 out 8 on the older GTSs), giving it a total of 112 stream processors instead of 96. Most other aspects of the card remain unchanged. However, because the only 2 add-in partners producing this card (BFG and EVGA) decided to overclock it, this version of the 8800 GTS actually ran slightly faster than a stock GTX in most scenarios, especially at higher resolutions, due to the increased clock speeds.

Nvidia released a new 8800 GTS 512 MB based on the 65 nm G92 GPU on December 10, 2007. This 8800 GTS has 128 stream processors, compared to the 96 processors of the original GTS models. It is equipped with 512 MB GDDR3 on a 256-bit bus. Combined with a 650 MHz core clock and architectural enhancements, this gives the card raw GPU performance exceeding that of 8800 GTX, but it is constrained by the narrower 256-bit memory bus. Its performance can match the 8800 GTX in some situations, and it outperforms the older GTS cards in all situations.

Technical summary
 Direct3D 10 and OpenGL 3.3 support
 1 Unified shaders: texture mapping units: render output units
 2 Full G80 contains 32 texture address units and 64 texture filtering units unlike G92 which contains 64 texture address units and 64 texture filtering units
 3 To calculate the processing power, see Performance.

Features 
 Compute Capability 1.1: has support for Atomic functions, which are used to write thread-safe programs.
 Compute Capability 1.2: for details see CUDA

GeForce 8M series
On May 10, 2007, Nvidia announced the availability of their GeForce 8 notebook GPUs through select OEMs. So far the lineup consists of the 8200M, 8400M, 8600M, 8700M and 8800M series chips. It was announced by Nvidia that some of their graphics chips have a higher than expected rate of failure due to overheating when used in particular notebook configurations. Some major laptop manufacturers made adjustments to fan setting and firmware updates to help delay the occurrence of any potential GPU failure. In late July 2008, Dell released a set of BIOS updates that made the laptop fans spin more frequently. As of mid-August 2008, nVidia had yet to give further details publicly, though it had been heavily rumored that all or most of the 8400 and 8600 cards had this issue.

GeForce 8400M series
The GeForce 8400M is the entry level series for the GeForce 8M chipset. Normally found on midrange laptops as an alternative solution to integrated graphics, the 8400M was designed for watching high definition video content rather than gaming. Versions include the 8400M G, 8400M GS, and 8400M GT. While these GPUs are not oriented for high-end gaming, the GDDR3-equipped 8400M-GT can handle most games of its time at medium settings, and was suitable for occasional gaming.

GeForce 8600M series
The GeForce 8600M was offered in midrange laptops as a mid-range performance solution for enthusiasts who want to watch high-definition content such as Blu-ray Disc and HD DVD movies and play then-current and some future games with decent settings. Versions include the 8600M GS and 8600M GT(GT being the more powerful one), and provided decent gaming performance (due to the implementation of GDDR3 memory in the higher-end 8600M models) for then-current games. It is currently on the Dell XPS M1530 portable, Asus G1S, Sony VAIO VGN-FZ21Z, in selected Lenovo Ideapad models, some models of the Acer Aspire 5920, Acer Aspire 9920G and BenQ Joybook S41, also available on the MacBook Pro, and some models of Fujitsu Siemens. The common failure of this chip in, amongst others, MacBook Pro's purchased between May 2007 and September 2008 were part of a class-action suit against nVidia which resulted in Apple providing an extended 4 year warranty related to the issue after confirming that the issue was caused by the Nvidia chip themselves. This warranty replacement service was expected to cost nVidia around $150 to $200 million  and knocked over $3 billion off their market capitalisation after being sued by their own shareholders for attempting to cover the issue up.

GeForce 8700M series
The GeForce 8700M was developed for the mid-range market. Currently the only version is the 8700M GT. This chipset is available on high-end laptops such as the Dell XPS M1730, Sager NP5793, and Toshiba Satellite X205. While this card is considered by most in the field to be a decent mid-range card, it is hard to classify the 8700M-GT as a high-end card due to its 128-bit memory bus, and is essentially an overclocked 8600M GT GDDR3 mid-range card. However, it shows strong performance when in a dual-card SLI configuration, and provides decent gaming performance in a single-card configuration.

GeForce 8800M series
The GeForce 8800M was developed to succeed the 8700M in the high-end market, and can be found in high-end gaming notebook computers.

Versions include the 8800M GTS and 8800M GTX. These were released as the first truly high-end mobile GeForce 8 Series GPUs, each with a 256-bit memory bus and a standard 512 megabytes of GDDR3 memory, and provide high-end gaming performance equivalent to many desktop GPUs. In SLI, these can produce 3DMark06 results in the high thousands.

Laptop models which include the 8800M GPUs are: Sager NP5793, Sager NP9262, Alienware m15x and m17x, HP HDX9494NR and Dell M1730. Clevo also manufactures similar laptop models for CyberPower, Rock, and Sager (among others) - all with the 8800M GTX, while including the 8800M GTS in the Gateway P-6831 FX and P-6860 FX models.

Technical summary

 The series has been succeeded by GeForce 9 series. The GeForce 9 Series has been in turn succeeded by the GeForce 200 Series. An exception to this is the GeForce 8400 GS, which has not been renamed in neither the GeForce 9 and GeForce 200 Series.

Problems
Some chips of the GeForce 8 series (concretely those from the G84 [for example, G84-600-A2] and G86 series) suffer from an overheating problem. Nvidia states this issue should not affect many chips, whereas others assert that all of the chips in these series are potentially affected. Nvidia CEO Jen-Hsun Huang and CFO Marvin Burkett were involved in a lawsuit filed on September 9, 2008, alleging their knowledge of the flaw, and their intent to hide it.

End-of-life driver support 

Nvidia has ceased Windows driver support for GeForce 8 series on April 1, 2016.

 Windows XP 32-bit & Media Center Edition: version 340.52 released on July 29, 2014; Download
 Windows XP 64-bit: version 340.52 released on July 29, 2014; Download
 Windows Vista, 7, 8, 8.1 32-bit: version 342.01 (WHQL) released on December 14, 2016; Download
 Windows Vista, 7, 8, 8.1 64-bit: version 342.01 (WHQL) released on December 14, 2016; Download
 Windows 10, 32-bit: version 342.01 (WHQL) released on December 14, 2016; Download
 Windows 10, 64-bit: version 342.01 (WHQL) released on December 14, 2016; Download

See also
 Comparison of Nvidia graphics processing units
 GeForce 7 series
 GeForce 9 series
 GeForce 100 series
 GeForce 200 series
 GeForce 300 series
 Nvidia Quadro - Nvidia workstation graphics system
 Nvidia Tesla - Nvidia's first dedicated general purpose GPU (graphical processor unit)

References

External links

 NVIDIA's GeForce 8 series page
 Nvidia GeForce 8800 Series
 Nvidia GeForce 8600 Series
 Nvidia GeForce 8500 Series
 Nvidia GeForce 8400 Series
 Nvidia GeForce 8800M Series
 Nvidia GeForce 8600M Series
 Nvidia GeForce 8400M Series
 Nvidia Nsight
 Nvidia GeForce Drivers for the GeForce 8x00 series (v. 340.52)
 NVIDIA GeForce 8800 GPU Architecture Overview - a somewhat longer and more detailed document about the new 8800 features
 OpenGL Extension Specifications for the G8x
 

Computer-related introductions in 2006
8 Series
Graphics cards